Krishna Nehru Hutheesing (2 November 1907 – 9 November 1967) was an Indian writer, the youngest sister of Jawaharlal Nehru and Vijaya Lakshmi Pandit, and part of the Nehru-Gandhi family.

Biography

Born Krishna Nehru, in Mirganj, Allahabad to Motilal Nehru, an Indian independence activist and leader of the Indian National Congress, and Swarup Rani, she was married to Gunottam (Raja) Hutheesing, who belonged to an Ahmedabad Jain family that built the Hutheesing Jain Temple. During the later 1950s, he became critic of Nehru and in 1959, supported former Governor General C. Rajagopalachari, to form a conservative market liberal political party known as the Swatantra Party.

She and her husband fought for India's independence and spent a great deal of time in jail. Raja's terms in jail came while they were raising their two young sons, Harsha Hutheesing and Ajit Hutheesing.

In 1950, Krishna and her husband toured the United States on a lecture tour. In late May 1958 Krishna spent three days in Israel. Her host was Yigal Alon, who a year earlier founded 'The Israel-India Friendship League' as a tool to circumvent the then Indian government policy to avoid direct diplomatic relations between the two states.

Mrs. Hutheesing documented her life as well as the lives of her brother, Jawaharlal and her niece, Indira Gandhi, in a series of books that intertwine history with personal anecdotes including We Nehrus, With No Regrets- An Autobiography, and Dear to Behold: An Intimate Portrait of Indira Gandhi

Her husband, Raja Hutheesing, also wrote books: The Great Peace: An Asian's Candid Report on Red China (1953), Window on China (1953), and Tibet fights for freedom : the story of the March 1959 uprising (1960).

Mrs. Hutheesing was associated with the 'Voice of America' and gave several talks. She died in London in 1967.

Bibliography
 Shadows On the Wall, J. Day Co., 1948.
 The Story of Gandhiji, Kutub Pub., 1949.
 We Nehrus, by Krishna (Nehru) Hutheesing with Alden Hatch. Holt, Rinehart and Winston; 1967.
 Dear to Behold: An Intimate Portrait of Indira Gandhi, Published by Macmillan, 1969.
 With No Regrets - An Autobiography, by Krishna Nehru Hutheesing, Published by READ BOOKS, 2007. . (Online text, 1945 edition)

References

External links

Krishna Nehru Hutheesing materials in the South Asian American Digital Archive (SAADA)

1907 births
1967 deaths
Indian women non-fiction writers
Women biographers
Women writers from Uttar Pradesh
Nehru–Gandhi family
Kashmiri people
Indian autobiographers
Indian independence activists from Uttar Pradesh
Prisoners and detainees of British India
Writers from Allahabad
Women autobiographers
20th-century Indian women writers
20th-century Indian biographers
Swatantra Party politicians
20th-century Indian politicians
Women Indian independence activists
Politicians from Allahabad
Women in Uttar Pradesh politics